The Middle Sister is a 1960 novel by Lois Duncan.

Plot
Teenage Ruth Porter, the middle child of two sisters, struggles with her tall and thin stature in contrast to her siblings, especially the older Janet. Ruth begins to imitate Janet, who aims for a career as a theatre actress.

Critical reception
Kirkus Reviews published a review of the novel, calling it "Well handled, this story of the ugly duckling should have a direct appeal to teen-age girls who will easily identify with the plight of struggling Ruth."

References

External links
The Middle Sister at Google Books

1960 American novels
American bildungsromans
Novels about siblings
Novels by Lois Duncan
Dodd, Mead & Co. books